Dominicus Baudius, a Latinised form of Dominique Baudier, (Lille, 8 April 1561 – Leiden, 22 August 1613) was a French Neo-Latin poet, scholar and historian. From 1603 to 1613 he was a teacher at the University of Leiden.

Life
Baudius was born in a calvinistic family in the Southern Netherlands in Lille. His original name was probably Dominique Baudier, though sources only show his Latinised name Dominicus Baudius. As a result of the arrival of the new regent of the low countries, the Duke of Alba in 1568, Baudius moved to Aachen along with his parents and sister. After finishing at the local school he proceeded to study theology first in Leiden from 1578 to 1579 and then in Geneva in 1581. In 1583 he returned to Leiden to study Law. In 1585 he graduated. During his time in Leiden he formed connections with Justus Lipsius and Janus Dousa.

After his study, Baudius became part of an envoy to England, where he stayed from 1583 to 1585 and where he formed a friendship with the poet Philip Sidney, introduced by Daniel Rogers. Back in the Netherlands he lived in Middelburg, and for some time served as advocate for the court of Holland in The Hague. In 1591 he left for France, where he remained for ten years. He stayed amongst others in Caen and Tours, and maintained himself with various jobs and support from friends such as Jacques-Auguste de Thou. However, he frequently had financial difficulties, and in 1598 he spent some time in prison in Paris because of debt incurred from a love-affair.

In 1602 Baudius was in London, after which he travelled to Leiden via Hamburg and The Hague, and he was appointed extraordinary professor of Rhetoric for the University of Leiden. He also taught law, and in 1611 he was appointed ordinary professor of history. In the same year he was appointed historian for the French States-General together with Johannes Meursius, with the assignment to write down the events of 1609–1611. This resulted in the Libri tres de Induciis belli Begici (Three books about the Truce in the dutch war). In Leiden he befriended amongst others Daniel Heinsius and Hugo Grotius. He must have had an attractive and cheerful personality as his classes were very popular.

His private life was in bad order. He was troubled by his drinking habits and love-affairs, and he always had financial difficulties. His first wife, whom he probably had not married lawfully, died in 1609. After he had an illegitimate child with a prostitute, he was suspended from the senate of the university of leiden in March 1612. He died in 1613, at the age of 52, after several days of heavy drinking. Dominicus Baudius was buried in the Peters-church in Leiden.

Works
Baudius attained his greatest fame as a Latin writer. He was erudite and had great control of Latin. He was one of the best letter-writers of his time and he is considered one of the best poets of the Iambic style in humanism. His letters were first published two years after his death. He published his first poetry collection in 1587. In 1591 a Jamborum liber followed after encouragement from Joseph Justus Scaliger and De Thou. In 1607 Baudius published a new version of his poems in Leiden (Poematum nova editio).

Twenty-five years after Baudius' death, Petrus Scriverius published a small collection of Baudius' work under the title of Amores.

Literature
P.L.M. Grootens, Dominicus Baudius. Een levensschets uit het Leidse humanistenmilieu 1561-1613, Nijmegen-Utrecht 1942

Notes

External links
De Heinsius-collectie: Dominicus Baudius (1561-1613)
Art. 'Baudius, Dominic', in: A New and General Biographical Dictionary, deel 2 (1784) 88-90
Dominici Baudi Epistolae, Leiden 1650, op Google Books

1561 births
1613 deaths
17th-century Dutch historians
Dutch male poets
Writers from Lille
Academic staff of Leiden University
Dutch Renaissance humanists